The King's Consort is a British period music orchestra founded in 1980 by the English conductor and harpsichordist Robert King (b. 1960, Wombourne). The ensemble has an associated choral group, Choir of The King's Consort. Together, they have made over 90 recordings, largely on the Hyperion label, and sold over 1,000,000 discs. The orchestra performs concert seasons in the UK and tours internationally.

Their repertoire is primarily from the baroque and early classical periods but has also included late 19th century repertoire as well as contemporary commissions by Michael Finnissy and, more recently, Michael Berkeley and includes recordings and live performances of opera and instrumental music. The ensemble's main performing base has been in London's Wigmore Hall from 1987, and the larger Cadogan Hall for performances that required both the orchestra and the choir. The King's Consort have performed seven times at the BBC Proms including The Coronation of King George II a special programme to celebrate the Golden Jubilee of Queen Elizabeth II (2002), Monteverdi's Vespers of 1610 (2004), Michael Haydn's Requiem Mass and Mozart's Coronation Mass (2006).

The King's Consort Choir appears on the sound tracks of several films, including The Chronicles of Narnia: The Lion, the Witch and the Wardrobe, Kingdom of Heaven, Pirates of the Caribbean: Dead Man's Chest and The Da Vinci Code.

Amongst their awards was the 2006 BBC Music Magazine Choral Award for their recording of Michael Haydn's Requiem Mass.

In June 2007, harpsichordist Matthew Halls temporarily took over as the group's Artistic Director from Robert King, who was jailed for the sexual abuse of minors. King molested five boys he was mentoring, the youngest of whom was 12, and was convicted of 14 counts of indecent assault over an 11-year period. On 1 May 2009, a new group directed by Halls (consisting of some of the then-current players, singers and soloists of The King's Consort) was launched under the new name, Retrospect Ensemble, following a decision by The King's Consort Board of Trustees. The name "The King's Consort" had been temporarily licensed to Halls's group but in 2009 reverted to Robert King.

Selected recordings
Rossini: Petite messe solennelle (Carolyn Sampson, Hilary Summers, Andrew Tortise, Andrew Foster-Williams, The King's Consort, Choir of The King's Consort, conductor Robert King) Hyperion CDA67570 
Mozart: Exsultate, jubilate! (Carolyn Sampson, The King's Consort, conductor Robert King) Hyperion CDA67560
Handel: The Choice of Hercules (Susan Gritton, Robin Blaze, Alice Coote, Charles Daniels, The King's Consort, conductor Robert King) Hyperion 67298
Purcell: The Complete Odes and Welcome Songs Volumes 1–8 (Mark Kennedy, Eamonn O'Dwyer, James Goodman, Susan Gritton, James Bowman, Nigel Short, Rogers Covey-Crump, Charles Daniels, Michael George, Choir of New College Oxford, The King's Consort, conductor Robert King) Hyperion 44031/8
Vivaldi: The Complete Sacred Music (Lynton Atkinson, Susan Gritton, Catherine Denley, Lisa Milne, David Wilson-Johnson, Deborah York, James Bowman, Catrin Wyn-Davies, Charles Daniels, Neal Davies, Ann Murray, et al., The King's Consort, conductor Robert King) Hyperion 44171
Monteverdi: Sacred Music Volumes 1–4 (Rogers Covey-Crump, Charles Daniels, Peter Harvey, Rebecca Outram, Carolyn Sampson, James Gilchrist, et al., The King's Consort, conductor Robert King) Hyperion 67428, 67438, 67487, 67519 
Bach: Mass in B Minor (Matthias Ritter, Manuel Mrasek, Matthias Schloderer, Maximilian Fraas, Anthony Rolfe Johnson, Michael George, Tölz Boys Choir, The King's Consort, conductor Robert King) Hyperion 22051
Handel: Parnasso in festa (Diana Moore, Carolyn Sampson, Lucy Crowe, Rebecca Outram, Ruth Clegg, Peter Harvey, The King's Consort, Choir of The King's Consort, conductor Matthew Halls) Hyperion CDA67701/2
Handel: Acis and Galatea (Claron McFadden, John Mark Ainsley, Rogers Covey-Crump, Michael George, The King's Consort, choir of the King's Consort, conductor Robert King) Hyperion CDA66361/2

References
Footnotes

Further references

Michael Church, 'We've found some real rarities', The Independent, 24 February 2006
Stephen Pettit, 'Intimate moments amid the Jubilee jollity', Evening Standard, 14 August 2002
Neil Fisher, Review of Prom 33: The King's Consort, The Times, 9 August 2006 (accessed 3 October 2007)

External links
 of The King's Consort
Audio Interview with Robert King on BBC Radio 4, 8 August 2002 (accessed 3 October 2007)
Discography on Hyperion Records (accessed 3 October 2007)
Robert King website

Early music consorts
British orchestras
Musical groups established in 1980